Gennady Alexeyevich Leonov (February 2, 1947 in Leningrad, Soviet Union – April 23, 2018) was a Russian scientist, Correspondent Member of the Russian Academy of Sciences (since 2006), Professor at the Saint Petersburg State University, Doctor of Sciences.
Laureate of the 1986 USSR State Prize and 2012 Aleksandr Andronov Russian Academy of Sciences Prize.

He graduated from the Leningrad State University in 1969.

In 1971 he defended his Candidate's Dissertation.
In 1983 he defended his doctoral dissertation.
In 1986 he received the title of Professor.

Since 1988, he served as Dean of the Faculty of Mathematics and Mechanics of the Saint Petersburg State University.

He was a foreign member of the Finnish Academy of Science and Letters (2017).

References

Obituaries
 
 N.V. Kuznetsov, S. Abramovich, A.L. Fradkov, G. Chen, In Memoriam: Gennady Alekseevich Leonov, International Journal of Bifurcation and Chaos, 28(5), 2018, art. num. 1877001
 S. Abramovich, N.V. Kuznetsov, P. Neittaanmäki, Obituary: Gennady Alekseevich Leonov (1947-2018), Open Mathematical Education Notes, 8(1), 2018, 15-21 

1947 births
2018 deaths
Saint Petersburg State University alumni
Academic staff of Saint Petersburg State University
Russian professors
Corresponding Members of the Russian Academy of Sciences
Members of the Finnish Academy of Science and Letters
Recipients of the USSR State Prize
Sportspeople from Saint Petersburg